Walter de Gant (died 1139), Lord of Folkingham was an English nobleman.

Walter was a son of Gilbert de Gant and Alice, Dame de Montfort-sur-Risle. He inherited the English titles of his father, while his younger brother Hugh adopted his mother’s surname and arms to inherit her French titles and lands.

He founded the priory at Bridlington, around 1113 for Augustinian Canons. He died in 1139, while as a monk at Bardney Abbey and was buried there.

Marriage and issue
Walter married Maud, daughter of Stephen, Count of Tréguier and Hawise de Guingamp, they are known to have had the following issue:
Gilbert de Gant, Earl of Lincoln, married Rohese de Clare, had issue.
Robert de Gant, married firstly Alice Paynel, with issue, and secondly Gunnor d’Aubigny, with issue.
Baldwin de Gant
Geoffrey de Gant
Alice de Gant, married firstly Ilbert de Lacy, without issue, and secondly Roger de Mowbray, with issue.
Matilda de Gand, married William de Welle.
William de Lindsay of Ercildoun, 1096-1147. Married Avice of Lancaster Montgomerie had issue Walter de Lindesay 1122-1164 and William de Lindesay.

Citations

References
Sanders, Ivor John. English Baronies: A Study of Their Origin and Descent, 1086-1327. Clarendon Press, 1960.

Year of birth unknown
1139 deaths